The Patuxent River stone is the state gem (a form of agate) of the U.S. state of Maryland. It is only found in Maryland and its red and yellow colors reflect the Maryland State Flag.

The Patuxent River stone became the state gem effective October 1, 2004 through the passage of Chapter 272, Acts of 2004; Code State Government Article, sec. 13-319.

References

Symbols of Maryland
Agates